The final of the Women's 200 metres event at the 2003 Pan American Games took place on Friday August 8, 2003, with the heats staged a day earlier. Silver medalist Cydonie Mothersille won the only medal for the Cayman Islands at the 2003 Pan American Games.

Medalists

Records

Results

See also
2003 World Championships in Athletics – Women's 200 metres
Athletics at the 2004 Summer Olympics – Women's 200 metres

Notes

References
Results

200 metres, Women's
2003
2003 in women's athletics